The Kvernhushaug Tunnel is a  tunnel along Norwegian National Road 7 in the municipality of Eidfjord in Vestland county, Norway.

The tunnel was officially opened together with the other tunnels in the valley in 1986.

References

External links
 Kvernhushaug Tunnel at Norgeskart

Road tunnels in Vestland
1986 establishments in Norway
Tunnels completed in 1986
Norwegian National Road 7